Xiphidothrips is a genus of thrips in the family Phlaeothripidae.

Species
 Xiphidothrips tambourissae

References

Phlaeothripidae
Thrips
Thrips genera